Two submarines of the United States Navy have been named USS Stingray for the stingray, a large ray with a whip-like tail and sharp spines capable of inflicting severe wounds:

 The first Stingray (Submarine No. 13), was a C-class submarine in commission from 1909 to 1919 that was renamed  in 1911 and served during World War I.
 For the fictional USS Stingray (SS-161), see Down Periscope.

United States Navy ship names
Submarines of the United States Navy